Preben Harris (born 30 March 1935) is a Danish film and stage actor.

Harris joined the Aarhus Theater in 1957 and worked in the Cinema of Denmark from 1964.

Selected filmography
Måske i morgen – 1964
Blind makker – 1976
The Double Man – 1976
Lille spejl – 1978
Operation Cobra – 1995
I Kina spiser de hunde – 1999
Bornholms stemme – 1999
At kende sandheden – 2002
Til højre ved den gule hund – 2003

External links
 
 Preben Harris at Danskefilm.dk

Danish male film actors
Danish male stage actors
People from Frederiksberg
Living people
1935 births